Harry Topping (21 September 1913 – 2001) was an English football player (who played at full back) and coach.

Career

Playing career
Topping was born in Kearsley, Lancashire and spent time with several Football League clubs, including Manchester City and Exeter City, where he made one league appearance, before a short spell at  New Brighton.

During World War II he played for Stockport County, where he partnered his namesake Henry Westby Topping in several wartime matches in 1941–42. He played for Bristol Rovers in the FA Cup campaign of 1945–46.

Coaching career
As a football coach, Topping managed RFC Roterdam and two of the Netherlands' biggest clubs in the early 1950s — Feyenoord between 1950 and 1951, and PSV between 1951 and 1952.

He was coach to Norwich City in their run to the 1958–59 FA Cup semi-final. After leaving Norwich he coached Torquay United.

References

1913 births
People from Kearsley
2001 deaths
English footballers
Manchester City F.C. players
Exeter City F.C. players
New Brighton A.F.C. players
Bristol Rovers F.C. players
Stockport County F.C. wartime guest players
English football managers
Feyenoord managers
PSV Eindhoven managers
English expatriate football managers
Association football fullbacks